Andrew Bolton (born January 24, 1980) is a retired American competitor in lightweight rowing. He won a gold medal in the eights at the 2008 World Championships and placed second in 2003. He also won a silver medal in the coxless fours at the 2007 Pan American Games.

References

External links

 

1980 births
Living people
American male rowers
Pan American Games medalists in rowing
Pan American Games silver medalists for the United States
World Rowing Championships medalists for the United States
Rowers at the 2007 Pan American Games
Medalists at the 2007 Pan American Games